Hassane Kamara (born 5 March 1994) is a professional footballer who plays as a left back for  club Watford on loan from Serie A club Udinese. Born in France, he plays for the Ivory Coast national team.

Club career

Châteauroux
Kamara is a youth exponent of Châteauroux. He made his Ligue 2 debut for the club on 4 April 2014 in a match against Clermont. On 2 May 2014, he scored his first league goal in a match against Laval.

Reims
In August 2015, Kamara signed with Reims before joining Paris FC on loan. He helped Reims win the 2017–18 Ligue 2, achieving promotion to Ligue 1 for the 2018–19 season.

Nice
On 26 June 2020, Kamara signed with Nice for an undisclosed fee reported to be around €4 million euros.

Watford 
On 4 January 2022, Kamara signed for English club Watford on a contract until June 2025.

Udinese
On 23 August 2022, Kamara signed for Serie A club Udinese for an undisclosed fee, returning on loan to Watford for the 2022–23 season.

International career
Kamara is of Malian, Gambian and Ivorian descent. He rejected a callup to the Gambia national team in March 2017. He debuted for the Ivory Coast national team in a friendly 2–1 win over Burkina Faso on 5 June 2021.

Career statistics

Club

Honours
Reims
 Ligue 2: 2017–18

References

External links
 
 

Living people
1994 births
Footballers from Seine-Saint-Denis
Sportspeople from Saint-Denis, Seine-Saint-Denis
Citizens of Ivory Coast through descent
Ivorian footballers
Ivory Coast international footballers
Ivorian people of Gambian descent
Ivorian people of Malian descent
French sportspeople of Ivorian descent
French sportspeople of Malian descent
French sportspeople of Gambian descent
Association football midfielders
LB Châteauroux players
Stade de Reims players
US Créteil-Lusitanos players
OGC Nice players
Watford F.C. players
Udinese Calcio players
Ligue 1 players
Ligue 2 players
Championnat National players
Championnat National 2 players
Championnat National 3 players
Premier League players
French expatriate footballers
Ivorian expatriate footballers
Expatriate footballers in England
French expatriate sportspeople in England
Ivorian expatriate sportspeople in England
Expatriate footballers in Italy
French expatriate sportspeople in Italy
Ivorian expatriate sportspeople in Italy
Black French sportspeople